Bièvre is a municipality of Wallonia located in the province of Namur, Belgium. 

On 1 January 2006 the municipality had 3,151 inhabitants. The total area is 109.59 km2, giving a population density of 29 inhabitants per km2.

The municipality consists of the following districts: Bièvre, Baillamont, Bellefontaine, Cornimont, Graide, Gros-Fays, Monceau-en-Ardenne, Naomé, Oizy, and Petit-Fays.

See also
 List of protected heritage sites in Bièvre

References

External links
 
Official website (in French)

Municipalities of Namur (province)